Nicolaus Schuback (February 18, 1700, Jork – July 28, 1783, Hamburg) was a lawyer from Germany. In the time from October 29, 1754 till August 28, 1782 he was mayor of Hamburg. Upon his death his family minted a special coin which was given to the people who attended the funeral.

See also 
 List of mayors of Hamburg

References

Sources 

1700 births
1783 deaths
Mayors of Hamburg
University of Jena alumni
University of Göttingen alumni
Grand burghers of Hamburg
18th-century jurists